The San Diego Siege was a women's professional basketball team in the now defunct National Women's Basketball League (NWBL).  Based in San Diego, California, they played only one season, during February and March 2006.

Team Record
2006 - 15-5

Team Schedule

External links
Siege Game Photos
NWBL 2006 Season Schedule
NWBL website (archive link)

Basketball teams in San Diego